Good hair may refer to:

 Good hair, a phrase
 Good Hair, a 2009 film
 Hair care, healthy hair
 African-American Hair